Notre-Dame-de-Bondeville is a commune in the Seine-Maritime department in the Normandy region in northern France.

Geography

Heraldry

Population

Places of interest
 The church of Notre-Dame, dating from the nineteenth century.
 The nineteenth century ropemaking factory, now a museum.
 Some thirteenth century ecclesiastical buildings.

See also
Communes of the Seine-Maritime department

References

External links

Website about the Museum at the Rope factory 

Communes of Seine-Maritime